Hassia (or Chasia) is a mountain in northern Greece.

Hassia may also refer to:
 Hassia Levy-Agron, an Israeli dancer, choreographer, and educator
 Hassia, Grevena (or Chasia), a former municipality in Grevena regional unit, West Macedonia, Greece
 Hassia, Trikala (or Chasia), a former municipality in the Trikala regional unit, Thessaly, Greece